David Benjamin Resnik (born November 30, 1962) is an American bioethicist who works at the National Institute of Environmental Health Sciences (NIEHS). He is known for his work on scientific misconduct. He earned his B.A. in philosophy from Davidson College, his M.A. and Ph.D. from the University of North Carolina at Chapel Hill, and his J.D. from Concord University School of Law. He taught at the University of Wyoming from 1990 to 1998, and directed the Center for the Advancement of Ethics there from 1995 to 1998. He then joined the Brody School of Medicine at East Carolina University (ECU) as associate professor of medical humanities and associate director of the Bioethics Center. He was promoted to full professor at ECU in 2002. In 2004, he left ECU to join the NIEHS. He was elected a fellow of the American Association for the Advancement of Science in 2017.

References

External links
Faculty profile

Bioethicists
American ethicists
1962 births
Living people
21st-century American philosophers
National Institutes of Health faculty
Davidson College alumni
University of North Carolina at Chapel Hill alumni
University of Wyoming faculty
East Carolina University faculty
Fellows of the American Association for the Advancement of Science
Philosophers of science